AFC Ann Arbor is an American soccer club based in Ann Arbor, Michigan that currently plays in USL League Two. The team played in the National Premier Soccer League from 2016 to 2019.

History

AFC Ann Arbor was started by a group of Ann Arbor residents with a desire to have a local team. The team had applied to the National Premier Soccer League for the 2015 season but its application was declined. Instead, AFC Ann Arbor and Grand Rapids FC, another team denied by the NPSL, decided to start a league of their own called the Great Lakes Premier League. The new league held its inaugural meetings on January 17, 2015.

Starting with the 2016 season, AFC Ann Arbor played in the National Premier Soccer League as part of the Midwest Region under manager Eric Rudland, formerly of Lansing United. They finished in second place in the Great Lakes West Division in their first NPSL season, advancing to the national playoffs, but ultimately losing to AFC Cleveland on penalty kicks.

The 2017 season brought more success for AFC Ann Arbor as they won their first ever Great Lakes Division Championship and the inaugural Michigan Milk Cup in the process. They again advanced to the NPSL national playoffs defeating the Dayton Dynamo in the second record (having received a bye in the first round) before falling to Detroit City FC 3–2 in extra time in the Midwest regional final.

The 2018 season brought AFC Ann Arbor their second consecutive Great Lakes Division Championship, topping FC Columbus 1–0 for the championship. AFCAA were given a bye to the semi-finals for the NPSL Midwest Regionals. The side hosted the semis and finals at Ann Arbor Huron High School. The club topped Cleveland SC 1–0 in the semi-finals, but fell to Duluth FC in penalty kicks in the final. Following the season's conclusion, Joseph Stanley Okumu, a center back that spent the 2018 season with the club, was named TopDrawerSoccer.com NPSL Player of the Year.

In the 2019 season, AFCAA made the playoffs for the fourth time in as many seasons in the NPSL. The postseason match was embroiled in controversy as the match against Rochester Lancers had to be called off in the 69th minute after a series of weather delays. Because Cardinal Stadium does not have lights, the match could not be completed outdoors and contingency plans were rejected by Lancers. After initially looking at a coin flip finish to the match, the match was finished in Erie, PA, where Lancers won in penalties. Ahead of the 2019 season, AFC Ann Arbor announced they would be adding a women's side set to begin play in United Women's Soccer. The side finished sixth in the six-team UWS Midwest winning two matches in their inaugural season.

Ahead of the 2020 season, AFC Ann Arbor announced their joining USL League Two.

Stadium
AFCAA's home field beginning with the 2019 season is Concordia University's Cardinal Stadium, located off of Geddes Road in Ann Arbor. Hollway Field, located at Pioneer High School, was AFCAA's home field for the first three seasons of the team's existence. The team then moved to Skyline High School for the 2018 season. Beginning in 2022, the team plays at Saline Hornet Stadium.

Head coaches
  David Hebestreit (2014–2015)
  Eric Rudland (2015–2021)
  Rod Asllani (2022–present)

Year-by-year

References

External links
 
 Main Street Hooligans – AFC Ann Arbor's First Supporter's Club

 
Association football clubs established in 2014
2014 establishments in Michigan
Culture of Ann Arbor, Michigan